Maitengwe is a large village located in the Central District of Botswana. It had 5,890 inhabitants at the 2011 census. It is one of many developing villages in the country and best known for its festive celebrations .

See also
 List of cities in Botswana

References

Populated places in Botswana